USS LST-503 was a  in the United States Navy during World War II. She was transferred to the Republic of China Navy as ROCS Chung Kuang (LST-216).

Construction and career 
LST-503 was laid down on 29 July 1943 at Missouri Valley Bridge and Iron Company, Evansville, Indiana. Launched on 8 October 1943 and commissioned on 8 December 1943.

Service in the United States Navy 
During World War II, LST-503 was assigned to the European theater. She then participated in the Invasion of Normandy from 6 to 25 June 1944.

She was decommissioned on 11 June 1946 and laid up in the Atlantic Reserve Fleet, Green Cove Springs, Florida.

On 9 January 1951, she was recommissioned and was homeported at NAB Little Creek, Virginia. In August, she was assigned to Operation Blue Bird in Greenland.

On 4 April 1955, the ship was decommissioned and transferred to the Republic of China.

LST-503 was struck from the Navy Register on 25 April 1960.

Service in the Republic of China Navy 
She was commissioned into the Republic of China Navy on 29 April 1955 and renamed ROCS Chung Kuang (LST-216).

The ship had participated in the transportation and replenishment missions of Kinmen Island many times during the 1958, 823 artillery battle.

In 1976, she was reclassified as LST-646 but was later reverted in the same year. So far, her main tasks are transportation of personnel and vehicles, and transportation to other islands.

Chung Kuang was decommissioned on 16 February 2009.

On 11 April 2016, the Ministry of National Defense agreed to display Chung Kuang's anchor at the Taoyuan National Home of Honor (桃園榮譽國民之家), Bade District.

On 29 July 2019, her together with her sister ship Chung Pang served as a target ship for multiple F-16s fired Harpoon missiles and was hit.

Awards 
LST-503 have earned the following awards:

American Campaign Medal
European-Africa-Middle East Campaign Medal (1 battle star)
World War II Victory Medal

Citations

Sources 
 
 
 
 

LST-491-class tank landing ships
Ships built in Evansville, Indiana
World War II amphibious warfare vessels of the United States
LST-491-class tank landing ships of the Republic of China Navy
1943 ships